The 35th Annual Tony Awards was broadcast by CBS television on June 7, 1981, from the Mark Hellinger Theatre. The hosts were Ellen Burstyn and Richard Chamberlain. The theme was "Women's Achievements in the Theatre."

The ceremony
Presenters: Jane Alexander, Lucie Arnaz, Beatrice Arthur, Lauren Bacall, Zoe Caldwell, Diahann Carroll, Nell Carter, Colleen Dewhurst, José Ferrer, Phyllis Frelich, Julie Harris, Helen Hayes, Celeste Holm, Lena Horne, Judith Jamison, Marjorie Bradley Kellogg, Angela Lansbury, Jane Lapotaire, Michael Learned, Priscilla Lopez, Patti LuPone, Andrea McArdle, Carolyn Mignini, Ann Miller, Tharon Musser, Patricia Neal, Carole Bayer Sager, Ntozake Shange, Meryl Streep, Elizabeth Taylor, Lynne Thigpen, Mary Catherine Wright, Patricia Zipprodt.

Performers: Richard Chamberlain, José Ferrer, Robert Goulet, Robert Klein, Jack Klugman, Peter Nero, Tony Randall, Christopher Reeve, Jason Robards, Tony Roberts, Richard Thomas, Ben Vereen, Billy Dee Williams.

Musicals represented:
 A Chorus Line ("What I Did For Love" - Priscilla Lopez)
 Ain't Misbehavin' ("Honeysuckle Rose" - Nell Carter)
 Annie ("Tomorrow" - Andrea McArdle)
 Evita ("Buenos Aires" - Patti LuPone)
 42nd Street ("Lullaby of Broadway" - Jerry Orbach and Company)
 Lena Horne: The Lady and Her Music ("If You Believe" - Lena Horne)
 Piaf ("La Vie en Rose" - Jane Lapotaire)
 Sophisticated Ladies ("Rockin' in Rhythm" - Company)
 Sweeney Todd: The Demon Barber of Fleet Street ("By The Sea" - Angela Lansbury)
 Tintypes (It's Delightful to be Married"/"Fifty-Fifty" - Company)
 Woman of the Year ("One of the Boys" - Lauren Bacall and Men)

Winners and nominees
Winners are in bold

Special awards
Lena Horne for Lena Horne: The Lady and Her Music
Regional Theatre Award: Trinity Square Repertory Company, Providence, Rhode Island

Multiple nominations and awards

These productions had multiple nominations:

8 nominations: 42nd Street and Sophisticated Ladies 
7 nominations: Amadeus and The Pirates of Penzance  
6 nominations: Woman of the Year
5 nominations: Fifth of July and The Little Foxes 
4 nominations: A Life 
3 nominations: Brigadoon, Can-Can and Tintypes
2 nominations: Camelot, The Floating Light Bulb, Piaf, Rose and To Grandmother's House We Go 

The following productions received multiple awards.

5 wins: Amadeus   
4 wins: Woman of the Year
3 wins: The Pirates of Penzance
2 wins: 42nd Street and Sophisticated Ladies

See also
 Drama Desk Awards
 1981 Laurence Olivier Awards – equivalent awards for West End theatre productions
 Obie Award
 New York Drama Critics' Circle
 Theatre World Award
 Lucille Lortel Awards

External links
Official site

Tony Awards ceremonies
1981 in theatre
1981 theatre awards
1981 in New York City
Tony